Idactus hieroglyphicus is a species of beetle in the family Cerambycidae. It was described by Taschenberg in 1883.

References

Ancylonotini
Beetles described in 1883